The 4 '''arrondissements of the Haute-Savoie department are:
 Arrondissement of Annecy, (prefecture of the Haute-Savoie department: Annecy) with 79 communes. The population of the arrondissement was 282,319 in 2016.  
 Arrondissement of Bonneville, (subprefecture: Bonneville) with 60 communes. The population of the arrondissement was 186,945 in 2016.  
 Arrondissement of Saint-Julien-en-Genevois, (subprefecture: Saint-Julien-en-Genevois) with 72 communes.  The population of the arrondissement was 186,343 in 2016.  
 Arrondissement of Thonon-les-Bains, (subprefecture: Thonon-les-Bains) with 68 communes.  The population of the arrondissement was 145,809 in 2016.

History

In 1860 the arrondissements of Annecy, Bonneville, Saint-Julien and Thonon were established. The arrondissement of Saint-Julien was disbanded in 1926, and restored in 1933.

References

Haute-Savoie